is a Tiger Mask anime series which premiered on October 2, 2016, with 38 episodes. It has a mix of 2D and 3D CGI animation.

It is a sequel of the original anime, whereas Tiger Mask II is only considered a parallel universe.

Plot 

Over forty years since Naoto Date mysteriously vanished after killing his arch-nemesis Tiger the Great in a brutal deathmatch, the Global Wrestling Monopoly (GWM) challenged the Zipangu Pro-Wrestling team and single-handedly destroyed them along with their manager Daisuke Fuji, who was brutally defeated by GWM's top fighter Yellow Devil. The incident drove two young members, Naoto Azuma, the main protagonist of the series, and his friend Takuma Fuji, son of Daisuke, to seek revenge on the GWM and the two parted ways. While Naoto trained under Kentaro Takaoka, Naoto Date's former ally, Takuma trained under the Tiger's Den, under the leadership of Mr. X, after being recruited by Yellow Devil under the pretence of giving him the chance for revenge.

Three years later, Naoto has taken the identity of Tiger Mask and signed for New Japan Pro-Wrestling (NJPW) while Takuma has taken on the identity of Tiger the Dark under the Tiger's Den, with none of them being aware of the other's identity but sharing the same goal. The GWM, under the leadership of Miss X, sees the new Tiger Mask as a threat that must be eliminated to ensure their control over the wrestling world and sends their fighters in several schemes to destroy him. Tiger Mask trains with the help of his current trainer and the aid of several pro wrestlers to become a stronger fighter with the ultimate goal to fight and defeat Yellow Devil.

Both he and Takuma have their first chance at the Masked Tournament hosted in Miss X's new Max Dome, their first step to conquering Japan, and hosting none other than Yellow Devil as one of the participants. Tiger Mask. with the advice of the Indian wrestler Mister Question, decides to develop his own signature technique and trains with his co-workers at NJPW to develop his technique. He eventually fights and defeats Takuma using an unperfected version of the move, and manages to face and defeat Yellow Devil but, much to his surprise, finds another man to have taken on its identity, leaving Naoto's and Takuma's quest inconclusive but with the revelation to Takuma that Tiger Mask is also looking after Yellow Devil. Takuma is eventually demoted to undergo the Tiger's Execution, which would make him a living punching bag, but decides to take the "Hell in the Hole" trial, an illegal wrestling match with several bets carrying a special chance which can restore him as a main fighter but at the risk of losing his life if he fails.

The "Hell in the Hole" trial begins, with its participants being wrestlers defeated by Tiger Mask, including Odin, Billy the Kidman, Black Python and Red Death Mask, as well as Ricardo, Cox, Phantom, Takuma and Kevin, Takuma's friend. The fight is a battle royale with no rules, wrestlers are given weapons after defeating contestants and alliances are possible too. Takuma and Kevin team up and eventually prevail over Odin, Billy the Kidman and Red Death Mask while the rest were eliminated. Takuma and Kevin are forced to fight a "gatekeeper" to gain their escape, but the wrestler is discovered to be a powerful robot. Odin regains conscience and aids the duo using a firebreath tool on the robot's face, which causes it to malfunction and assault the nearby spectators. The strongest wrestler of the Tiger's Den, Tiger the Third, faces and easily defeats the robot with a piledriver. Takuma, Kevin and Odin thus succeed in the Hell in the Hole, but Odin quits the GWM.

The GWM then prepares their next big tournament, Wrestle Max War Game, which will pit wrestlers from all around the world for the right to challenge Tiger the Third, who is the World Heavyweight Champion, for the belt and a Million Dollar Prize. Tiger the Third will also participate in the event himself. Naoto decides to enter the tournament in order to become champion, as it will allow him to select his opponents and as such be able to force the true Yellow Devil out of hiding. Thinking that the battle may not play out one-on-one, Naoto decides to request Fukuwara Mask to partner with him to increase his chances of winning.

The day of the War Game begins and the rules are explained, the wrestlers will fight in a pyramid-shaped ring with five stages and a ground level. They are divided in four blocks which are interconnected and when the bell sounds, they will be able to move between blocks. Once a wrestler defeats an opponent, he will be allowed to move to the next stage, where he fights his next opponent, and repeat the process until the first two fighters are standing at the top stage of the ring, at which point the battle is over. Following an interval the two combatants will fight and the winner earns the right to challenge Tiger the Third. The Champion, being one of the participants, declares that whoever defeats him can take the belt. Surprisingly, a man taking the name of Yellow Devil is also a participant, causing Naoto and Takuma to pursue him.

The fights rage, and Takuma finds and easily defeats Yellow Devil, unmasking him as an impostor. Tiger the Third faces Ryu Wakamatsu in his Dragon Young persona, Fukuwara Mask and Tetsuya Naito, making him the first fighter to get to the top. Tiger Mask and Tiger the Dark face off once more with the fight being even grounded. Tiger Mask uses his Tiger Driver move, but Takuma is able to counter it at the last moment. Before Naoto and Takuma can resume their fight, Kevin interferes and ambushes Naoto, allowing Takuma to defeat him, thus Tiger the Dark is able to challenge Tiger the Third for the championship. A recess takes place before the fight, but Takuma is revealed to be greatly injured as a result of Naoto's knee strike.

Before his match, Takuma is alerted that Tiger the Third is potentially the true Yellow Devil. In order to confirm it, he bets his mask with Tiger the Third, which he accepts. The match begins and Takuma seemingly gains the upper hand. Tiger the Third then confirms Takuma's suspicions that he's indeed Yellow Devil by using his old signature techniques. Takuma is able to counter his Devil's Crush and almost defeats The Third. However, the injuries caused by Naoto take his toll and Tiger the Third uses his true finishing move Sacrifice, greatly injuring Takuma and causing his defeat. The Third then unmasks Takuma, revealing his identity to Naoto, who rushes to his friend's side revealing his own identity as well as he's transported to the hospital.

A mysterious trio of wrestlers calling themselves the "Miracle 3" appear and sabotage several NJPW matches by committing fouls, while promising to keep "multiplying". After Tiger Mask battles one of GWM's strongest fighters, King Tiger, and defeats him in a deadly fight, Miss X agrees to let Tiger Mask challenge Tiger the Third, but bind him by a contract that forces him to betray NJPW and align himself with the Miracles. As the battles escalate, Tiger Mask, desperate to get his match with Tiger the Third, sinks to committing fouls along with the Miracles in the matches, which destroys his reputation.

During a final encounter between the Miracles and NJPW in a 5-on-5 match, Tiger Mask is cruelly used as a tool in order to secure a victory against Kazuchika Okada, NJPW's strongest wrestler. Before NJPW is able to win against the Miracles, Tiger the Third and Miss X interrupt the match. Tiger Mask attempts to attack Tiger the Third, but is easily countered. Miss X then announces the Final Wars, the ultimate confrontation between NJPW and the GWM, where the winner will take all the belts from the losers, effectively making it an all-or-nothing match. Yuji Nagata reluctantly accepts the challenge. Meanwhile, Tiger Mask is struggling, as his recent actions have eroded his trust with NJPW, leaving him alone and still bound to the GWM by contract, despite his assault against Tiger the Third. As a result, he is forced by Miss X to fight Mr. Miracle IV in another match. Mr. Miracle IV reveals himself to be Universal Mask, an expert in aerial combat while the two fight in a special ring elevated from the floor level and with pipes, giving Universal Mask a one-sided advantage, which is meant to punish Tiger Mask for his betrayal. Tiger Mask eventually defeats him thanks to Fukuwara Mask's advice, but has difficulties in developing a new killer move.

Tiger Mask decides to go to Kyoto in order to gain inspiration for a killer move from the Arashi Dojo, just like Naoto Date did at one point. However, he comes to find two Dojos, with one being a fake. Tiger Mask helps unravel the impostor and gains useful advice from the true master, but is still not sufficient knowledge. The Final Wars begin between NJPW and GWM. During the first fight, NJPW gains an advantage but Mr. Miracle III interferes, causing Tiger Mask to intercept the Miracles' foul combo and rendering the match a no contest. Immediately after, as per the contract with the GWM, Tiger Mask is forced to fight the final fight against Mr. Miracle II, who is GWM's coach O'Connor, in a Lumberjack match where any fighter who leaves the ring must be returned by seconds. However, the match quickly becomes vicious as Mr. Miracle III continuously pushes Tiger outside the ring to be mercilessly punished by GWM's seconds, effectively making it a 4-on-1 fight. Having regained their trust, NJPW interferes on Tiger Mask's behalf, allowing him to defeat Mr. Miracle III and reform their alliance.

After losing two fights against NJPW, Tiger's Den sends on their strongest reinforcements, Big Tiger the Second and Black Tiger, two wrestlers who are part of Tiger's Den Four Heavenly Kings, along with the previously defeated King Tiger, whose strength is only surpassed by Tiger the Third. A tag match is scheduled with Big Tiger the Second and Black Tiger against Tiger Mask and Yuji Nagata. The NJPW pair, however, is soundly defeated and Nagata is seriously injured by Big Tiger the Second. Takuma requests Naoto to allow him to use his training him to accelerate his recovery and Takaoka agrees.

The Final Wars begin, consisting of five different matches. The first one ends in a draw between Black Tiger and Togi Makabe as they are both counted out. The second match is a double tag-match with Black Tiger and Tiger the Third vs Makabe and Kazuchika Okada. Makabe is able to knock Black Tiger unconscious, but is himself defeated by Tiger the Third's Devil Crush, earning GWM a win. In the next round, a triple tag-match, Big Tiger the Second, Mr. Miracle I and Mr. Miracle II face Hiroshi Tanahashi, Tiger Mask and Tiger the Dark, who joins NJPW. During the fight, Mr. Miracle II unmasks himself as Kevin and battles Takuma until he is knocked unconscious by Tiger Mask's new killer move Tiger Fang. However, Big Tiger the Second defeats Tanahashi with his Skewer move, granting GWM a second win. The following round is a double tag-match of Tiger Mask and Tiger the Dark vs Tiger the Third and Big Tiger the Second. During the fight, Tiger the Third unmasks Naoto by ripping his mask. Tiger the Dark, with renewed strength from his father's encouragement, assaults Tiger the Third and Big Tiger the Second with his new killer move, Crossbow, injuring them both and allowing Naoto to defeat Big Tiger the Second, earning NJPW a win. For the fifth single match, Mr. Miracle I faces NJPW's champion Okada. However, Mr. Miracle I blinds Okada by spitting Asian Mist into his eyes.

Okada is able to defeat Mr. Miracle I despite his handicap, but his arm is badly injured, so Naoto fights with a new patched mask under the name Tiger Mask W to face Tiger the Third in a Sudden Death Match. The two fight, with Naoto combining his own moves alongside Takuma's. Although effective, Tiger the Third severely injures Naoto with a chain of Devil's Tornadoes. Attempting to defeat him with the Devil's Crush, the move fails and Naoto counters and injures Tiger the Third. The two clash for a final time, but Tiger the Third's arm gives out, causing him to be unable to counter Naoto's Tiger Fang. Tiger the Third is instantly defeated, which causes the destruction of the Tiger's Den. Naoto and Takuma part ways, deciding to fight abroad using new masks made of a combination of their former masks and calling themselves Tiger Mask W. They vowed to meet each other again in the ring, either as a tag team or as opponents.

Following Naoto and Takuma's departure, Miss X founds and leads her own organization, Girls Wrestling Movement, recruiting Haruna Takaoka to serve as her main fighter under her Spring Tiger (later Springer) alter ego, along with her friends Milk and Mint. Although Haruna is initially reluctant to pursue a wrestling career due to Yoko Takaoka's disapproval, who is against it because the truth about her hero Tiger Mask made her mother despise the sport she had always revered as a child, after a month of fighting and later defeating Japan's strongest female wrestler, Mother Devil, along with Miss X's encouragement, she builds up the courage to tell her family.

Broadcast 

 Director: Toshiaki Komura
 Script: Katsuhiko Chiba
 Music: Yasuharu Takanashi and -yaiba-
 Character Design: Hisashi Kagawa
 Art Design: Yoshito Watanabe
 Action Animation Director: Junichi Hayama

The opening theme is "Ike! Tiger Mask" ( 行け!タイガーマスク; Go! Tiger Mask) by Shōnan no Kaze and the ending theme is "KING OF THE WILD" also by Shonan no Kaze. The opening theme is a new rendition of the opening in the original Tiger Mask, which was originally performed by Hideyo Morimoto. The show airs on TV Asahi's 26:45 (2:45 AM) time slot on Saturday, technically Sunday morning.

Naoto Date's training facility on Mount Fuji and his dream about a children land are original from the manga, but omitted in the first anime.

Promotion 
In conjunction with the premiere of the show, NJPW debuted a live action version of Tiger Mask W, portrayed by Kota Ibushi, on October 10, 2016, at their King of Pro-Wrestling event. Since then, Red Death Mask, portrayed by Juice Robinson, and Tiger the Dark, portrayed by A. C. H., have also debuted for NJPW.

References

External links 
 
  
  at TV Asahi 

2016 anime television series debuts
Martial arts anime and manga
Wrestling in anime and manga
Toei Animation television
Television series about tigers